Jon Jones is a Welsh film and television writer and director working primarily in the United Kingdom and the United States. He has directed numerous dramas for British and American television including the award-winning When I'm Sixty-Four (Prix Europa - Best TV FIlm), The Diary of Anne Frank, Blood Strangers, The Alan Clark Diaries (Director's Guild of Great Britain Best Director), A Very Social Secretary (Broadcast Press Award - Best Film), Northanger Abbey, Zen, Mr Selfridge and Going Postal.

Most recent projects are Lawless for Sky, American Odyssey and Heroes Reborn for NBCUniversal, Legends for Fox21 and Hanna for Amazon Studios.

In 2019 the feature film Last Summer, directed and written by Jon Jones, won the BAFTA Cymru for best feature film.

Biography

Early life, education and early career
Jonathan Rhys Jones was born on 5 March 1967, in Carmarthen, Carmarthenshire. He was raised near Narberth, Pembrokeshire, until the age of 18, attending Netherwood School, in Saundersfoot, then Oundle School, Northamptonshire, where he was in Fisher House (then called Laxton House). While at Oundle, he developed a passion for the dramatic arts, directing plays at the school's theatre, The Stahl. He graduated from University of Manchester with a degree in English literature and worked variously on archeological digs in Ecuador, as a flyman, prop maker and scenic carpenter in a repertory theatre, as a night watchman, a meat packer, a kitchen porter, a fruit picker and building labourer.
His first job in the film and television industry was as a carpenter, building sets for advertisements and pop promos. From there he worked his way up the art department in a variety of roles, finishing up as an art director working on a number of BBC dramas and the feature film The Young Americans, before returning to study direction at the National Film and Television School, Beaconsfield. Upon leaving three years later, his first directing jobs were Edith's Finger, which won the BAFTA Cymru for Best Short Film, and the ITV series Cold Feet, in 2000, with his three episodes receiving an average of 9 million viewers.

Film and television career 
He went on to direct the ITV crime drama Blood Strangers, which The Guardian described as "ITV's respite from the ratings doldrums." The series was nominated for a PRIX Italia television award in 2002. He went on to direct The Debt,  a two-part British television crime drama film starring Warren Clarke, and a young Martin Freeman;  When I'm Sixty Four, which won the Prix Europa in 2005 for Best Television Film, and followed the unlikely tale of two old men who fall in love and The Alan Clark Diaries, which was made in close collaboration with the surviving members of the Clark family and documented the tale of an outspoken and humorous British politician, played by John Hurt. The Alan Clark Diaries led to work on A Very Social Secretary, which made the front page of the London Evening Standard on its broadcast as the launch film of the new UK channel More4 as a consequence of its boldness in satirising the then-ruling Labour Party. It won the Broadcast Press Award that year.

During 2005 he also directed Archangel, a Soviet thriller starring Daniel Craig. In 2006, he worked on The Secret Life of Mrs Beeton followed by Northanger Abbey in 2007. Northanger Abbey featured Felicity Jones in her first adult role, as well as the young Carey Mulligan. This Andrew Davies adaptation of Jane Austen's least-known novel is frequently put in the top ten of all filmed Austen adaptations, most recently by The Daily Telegraph in January 2013 on the 200th anniversary of the publication of Pride and Prejudice.

His next direction job was The Diary of Anne Frank, which was the first production since 1959 to be given permission by the Anne Frank-Fonds to use the actual words of Anne Frank's diary. It was made in close collaboration with the Anne Frank House, in an attempt to make as accurate a portrayal as possible. The production was extremely well-received worldwide. He went on to direct Going Postal in 2010, followed by Zen, with each episode reaching well over 5 million viewers.

In 2012, he directed Julian Fellowes' Titanic, which won a BAFTA for best visual effects in 2013. That year, Jones directed Mr Selfridge, for ITV, Da Vinci's Demons, which won a Primetime Emmy Award, and Lawless - an intense legal drama screened as part of Sky's "Drama Matters”, starring Suranne Jones and Lindsay Duncan. After directing ITV's The Great Fire, in 2014, he went on to direct American Odyssey for NBCUniversal, starring Anna Friel and Peter Facinelli; Legends for Fox21 and TNT with Sean Bean; Heroes Reborn for NBCUniversal and more recently Still Star Crossed for ABC and Shondaland; and Ransom -  an internationally co-produced drama television series created by David Vainola.

Last Summer was released in 2019 and was his first independently written and directed project, a coming-of-age drama set in 1970s rural Wales, praised by critics at film festivals worldwide including the Austin Film Festival and the Vancouver International Film Festival. He then directed his most recent work, Hanna, starring Mireille Enos and Joel Kinnaman for Amazon Studios, which received wide commercial attention partially due to its release on Amazon Prime Video.

On October 13, 2019, Last Summer won Best Feature Film at the BAFTA Cymru Awards 2019, and Jones was presented with the award by Huw Stephens of the BBC.

Filmography 

 Greek Lover (1999) - writer and director
 Edith's Finger (2000) - director
 Cold Feet (2000) - director
 Blood Strangers (2002) - director
 The Debt (2003) - director
 When I'm Sixty-Four (2004) - director
 The Alan Clark Diaries (2004) - writer and director
 Archangel (2005) - director
 A Very Social Secretary (2005) - director
 The Secret Life of Mrs Beeton (2006) - director
 Northanger Abbey (2007) - director
 The Diary of Anne Frank (2009) - director
 Going Postal (2010) - director
 Zen (2011) - director
 Titanic (2012) - director
 Mr Selfridge (2013) - director
 Rogue (2013) - director
 Lawless (2013) - director
 Da Vinci's Demons (2014) - director
 The Great Fire (2014) - director
 American Odyssey (2015) - director
 Legends (2015) - director
 Heroes Reborn (2016) - director
 Ransom (2017) - director
 Still Star-Crossed (2017) - director
 Last Summer (2018) - writer, producer, director
 Hanna (2019) - director

Awards 

 BAFTA Cymru - Best Short Film (1999) For Edith's Finger
 Director's Guild of Great Britain - Outstanding Directorial Achievement in 30-Minute Television (2004) For The Alan Clark Diaries
 Broadcasting Press Guild Award - Best Single Drama (2005) For A Very Social Secretary
 BAFTA Cymru - Best Feature Film (2019) For Last Summer

External links
Jon Jones at the British Film Institute

British male screenwriters
Welsh television directors
Living people
1967 births
People from Carmarthen
Welsh film directors
Welsh screenwriters
People educated at Oundle School